Nai Basti may refer to:

Nai Basti, Kurukshetra
Nai Basti, Anantnag